New Haven is an unincorporated community and census-designated place in Mitchell County, Iowa, United States. As of the 2010 Census the population of New Haven was 91.

Demographics

History
New Haven was first settled circa 1883; there had been a general store at the site since 1878. New Haven's population was 19 in 1902, and 27 in 1925.

References

Unincorporated communities in Mitchell County, Iowa
Unincorporated communities in Iowa